The Girl in Tails (Swedish: Flickan i frack) is a 1926 Swedish silent comedy drama film directed by Karin Swanström and starring Einar Axelsson, Magda Holm and Nils Aréhn. It was based on the 1925 novel The Girl in Tails by Hjalmar Bergman.

Cast
 Einar Axelsson as 	Count Ludwig von Battwhyl
 Magda Holm as 	Katja Kock
 Nils Aréhn as 	Old Karl Axel Kock
 Georg Blomstedt as 	Rector Starck
 Karin Swanström as 	Widow Hyltenius
 Kar de Mumma as 	Curry Kock 
 Carina May as 	Eva Björck
 Lotten Olsson as 	Lizzy Willman
 Anna-Lisa Baude as Lotten Brenner 
 Gösta Gustafson as 	Björner
 Kurt Welin as 	Basist at 'Kupan'	
 Edla Rothgardt as 	A Harp
 Julia Cæsar as 	Statarhustru

References

Bibliography
 Gustafsson, Tommy. Masculinity in the Golden Age of Swedish Cinema: A Cultural Analysis of 1920s Films. McFarland, 2014.

External links

1926 films
1926 comedy films
Swedish comedy films
Swedish silent feature films
Swedish black-and-white films
Films based on Swedish novels
Films directed by Karin Swanström
1920s Swedish-language films
Silent comedy films
1920s Swedish films